HMS Preventer (Z265) was a net laying ship for the Royal Navy during the Second World War acquired from the United States Navy in September 1944 via Lend-Lease.

On 17 January 1944, while still under construction, the ship was reclassified as a net laying ship and redesignated AN-77. Seagrape was launched on 9 August and completed on 30 September.

After delivery to the U.S. Navy on 30 September, she was transferred to the United Kingdom under Lend-Lease the same day and commissioned into the Royal Navy as HMS Preventer (Z265). Upon completion of wartime duty with the United Kingdom, she was returned to the U.S. Navy on 10 January 1946. Struck from the Naval Vessel Register in March 1946, she was transferred to the United States Maritime Commission on 1 April 1947.

References 
 
 YN-90 / AN-77 Seagrape, HMS Preventer (Z-265)

 

Ailanthus-class boom defence vessels of the Royal Navy
Ships built in Wilmington, Delaware
1944 ships
World War II net laying ships